José Castillo Pérez (born 2 December 2001) is a Mexican professional footballer who plays as a full-back for Liga MX club Pachuca.

International career
Castillo was called up by Raúl Chabrand to participate with the under-21 team at the 2022 Maurice Revello Tournament, where Mexico finished the tournament in third place.

Career statistics

Club

Honours
Pachuca
Liga MX: Apertura 2022

References

External links
 
 
 

2001 births
Living people
Mexico youth international footballers
Association football defenders
Liga MX players
C.F. Pachuca players
Footballers from Mexico City
Mexican footballers